RC Hasselt is a Belgian rugby club in Hasselt.

History
The club was founded in 2010 in its present form, though there had been a rugby team before.

External links
 RC Hasselt

Belgian rugby union clubs
Rugby clubs established in 2010
Sport in Hasselt